Habibullo Rajabov is an Indologist from Tajikistan. In 2018, he was conferred the Padma Sri by the President of India for his contribution to the fields of education and literature. He is the first Tajik national to receive the award.

References 

Indian Indologists
Living people
Year of birth missing (living people)